Mararikulam South is a panchayat and part of Mararikulam. It is in Alappuzha district, India.

References 

Places in Alappuzha district